Le avventure di Laura Storm (1965) is an Italian television series, starring Lauretta Masiero and Aldo Giuffrè.

See also
List of Italian television series

External links
 

Italian television series
RAI original programming